is a Japanese professional baseball pitcher for the Tokyo Yakult Swallows of Nippon Professional Baseball (NPB). He has played in Nippon Professional Baseball (NPB) for the Hokkaido Nippon-Ham Fighters.

Career

Hokkaido Nippon-Ham Fighters
Hokkaido Nippon-Ham Fighters selected Miyadai with the seventh selection in the 2017 NPB draft.

On August 23, 2018, Miyadai made his NPB debut.

On December 2, 2020, he become a free agent.

Tokyo Yakult Swallows
On December 23, 2020, Miyadai signed with Tokyo Yakult Swallows of NPB.

References

External links

 NPB.com

1995 births
Living people
Baseball people from Kanagawa Prefecture
Hokkaido Nippon-Ham Fighters players
Japanese baseball players
Nippon Professional Baseball pitchers
Tokyo Yakult Swallows players
University of Tokyo alumni